The East Pacific ventbrotula (Ventichthys biospeedoi) is a species of cusk-eel found around thermal vents on the southern East Pacific Rise at depths of about . This species grows to a length of  SL. It is the only known member of its genus. The generic name is a compound of vent, for the Oasis hydrothermal vent on the south East Pacific Rise (at a depth of ) and the Greek ichthys meaning "fish", while the specific name refers to the French BIOSPEEDO expedition to the south East Pacific Rise which collected the type specimen in 2004.

References

Ophidiidae
Monotypic fish genera
Fish described in 2006